The Second Viennese School was the group of composers that comprised Arnold Schoenberg and his pupils, particularly Alban Berg and Anton Webern, and close associates in early 20th-century Vienna. Their music was initially characterized by late-Romantic expanded tonality and later, a totally chromatic expressionism without firm tonal centre, often referred to as atonality; and later still, Schoenberg's serial twelve-tone technique. Adorno said that the twelve-tone method, when it had evolved into maturity, was a "veritable message in a bottle", addressed to an unknown and uncertain future. Though this common development took place, it neither followed a common time-line nor a cooperative path. Likewise, it was not a direct result of Schoenberg's teaching—which, as his various published textbooks demonstrate, was highly traditional and conservative.  Schoenberg's textbooks also reveal that the Second Viennese School spawned not from the development of his serial method, but rather from the influence of his creative example.

Members 

The principal members of the school, besides Schoenberg, were Alban Berg and Anton Webern, who were among his first composition pupils. Both of them had already produced copious and talented music in a late Romantic idiom but felt they gained new direction and discipline from Schoenberg's teaching. Other members of this generation included Ernst Krenek, Heinrich Jalowetz, Erwin Stein and Egon Wellesz, and somewhat later Eduard Steuermann, Hanns Eisler, Robert Gerhard, Norbert von Hannenheim, Rudolf Kolisch, Paul A. Pisk, Karl Rankl, Josef Rufer, Nikos Skalkottas, Viktor Ullmann, and Winfried Zillig. Schoenberg's brother-in-law Alexander Zemlinsky is sometimes included as part of the Second Viennese School, though he was never Schoenberg's pupil and never renounced a traditional conception of tonality. 

Though Berg and Webern both followed Schoenberg into total chromaticism and both, each in his own way, adopted twelve-tone technique soon after he did, not all of these others did so, or waited for a considerable time before following suit. Several yet later disciples, such as Zillig, the Catalan Gerhard, the Transylvanian Hannenheim and the Greek Skalkottas, are sometimes covered by the term, though (apart from Gerhard) they never studied in Vienna but as part of Schoenberg's masterclass in Berlin. 

Membership in the school is not generally extended to Schoenberg's many pupils in the United States from 1933, such as John Cage, Leon Kirchner and Gerald Strang, nor to many other composers who, at a greater remove, wrote compositions evocative of the Second Viennese style, such as the Canadian pianist Glenn Gould. By extension, however, certain pupils of Schoenberg's pupils, such as Berg's pupil Hans Erich Apostel and Webern's pupils René Leibowitz, Leopold Spinner and Ludwig Zenk, are usually included in the roll-call.

Practices 
Though the school included highly distinct musical personalities (the styles of Berg and Webern are in fact very different from each other, and from Schoenberg—for example, only the works of Webern conform to the rule stated by Schoenberg that only a single row be used throughout all movements of a composition—while Gerhard and Skalkottas were closely involved with the folk music of their respective countries) the impression of cohesiveness was enhanced by the literary efforts of some of its members. Wellesz wrote the first book on Schoenberg, who was also the subject of several Festschriften put together by his friends and pupils; Rufer and Spinner both wrote books on the technique of twelve-tone composition; and Leibowitz's influential study of Schoenberg, Berg and Webern, Schoenberg et son école, helped to establish the image of a school in the period immediately after World War II in France and abroad. Several of those mentioned (e.g. Jalowetz, Rufer) were also influential as teachers, and others  (e.g. Kolisch, Rankl, Stein, Steuermann, Zillig) as performers, in disseminating the ideals, ideas and approved repertoire of the group. Perhaps the culmination of the school took place at Darmstadt almost immediately after World War II, at the Internationale Ferienkurse für Neue Musik, wherein Schoenberg—who was invited but too ill to travel—was ultimately usurped in musical ideology by the music of his pupil, Webern, as composers and performers from the Second Viennese School (e.g. Leibowitz, Rufer, Adorno, Kolisch, Heiss, Stadlen, Stuckenschmidt, Scherchen) converged with the new serialists (e.g. Boulez, Stockhausen, Maderna, Nono, et al.).

First Viennese School 

German musical literature refers to the grouping as the "Wiener Schule" or "Neue Wiener Schule". The existence of a "First Viennese School" is debatable. The term is often assumed to connote the great Vienna-based masters of the Classical style working in the late 18th and early 19th century, particularly Joseph Haydn, Wolfgang Amadeus Mozart, Ludwig van Beethoven and Franz Schubert. Though Mozart and Schubert did not study with Haydn, Mozart and Haydn were admirers of each other's work and evidence suggests that the two composers fed off the other's compositional craftsmanship.  Beethoven, however, did for a time receive lessons from the older master, Haydn, though he was not a pupil in the sense that Berg and Webern were pupils of Schoenberg.

See also
Skandalkonzert

References

Further reading 
 René Leibowitz, Schoenberg et son école (Paris, Editeur J B Janin, 1947) translated by Dika Newlin as Schoenberg and His School: The Contemporary Stage of the Language of Music (New York, Philosophical Library, 1949)

External links 
 Arnold Schoenberg Center in Vienna